Pasko may refer to:
 Pasko (name)
 The common name for the Christmas in the Philippines
 Pasko Naming Hangad, the third album by Hangad
 Kapuso sa Pasko, a Filipino Christmas music album
 Puso ng Pasko, a 1998 Filipino comedy fantasy film 
 Puso ng Pasko: Artista Challenge, a Filipino reality TV show
 Sana Ngayong Pasko, a Filipino drama

See also
Pashko
Pasco (disambiguation)
Pascoe (disambiguation)